René Mercier (end of the 19th century – 1 January 1973) was a 20th-century French composer and conductor.

Biography 
Little is known about the life of René Mercier. Even his birth date is unknown. Composer of second rank, he is best known as a conductor. He never got very big personal success, apart from a few songs: : Elle s'était fait couper les cheveux, in reference to the flappers of the 1920s. His patriotic song  , written during the war (1916) remains one of his great success, due to the circumstances.

His operetta composer's career is uneven. J'te veux stayed 260 days in theaters. His biggest theatrical success is Déshabillez-vous (168 représentations). The following year, Bégonia was also successful, thanks to the presence of Dranem.

He participated as a composer in several films of the 30s.

After World War II, he was conductor in various music halls, including the ABC from 1948 to 1955. At the Théâtre des Capucines, he composed the 1945 review with Raoul Moretti.

Main works 
Vocal music
 1922 : Les Fifilles de Loth
 1923 : Benjamin
 1923 : J'te veux
 1925 : Le Pêché capiteux
 1928 : Déshabillez-vous !
 1930 : Bégonia
 1934 : Elles font toutes l'amour
 1935 : La Reine de la Sierra
 1936 : Un p'tit bout d'femme
 1937 : Échalote et ses amants

Songs
 1916: , lyrics by Eugène Joullot and Jack Cazol
 1925: Elle s'était fait couper les cheveux, lyrics by Vincent Telly, sung by Alexandre Dréan
 1931: , lyrics by Simon Deylon
 1932: Totor t'as tort  Filmography 
 1931: The Man at Midnight by Harry Lachman
 1932: Sergeant X by Vladimir Strizhevsky
 1932: Kiss Me by Léon Mathot (with Vincent Scotto)
 1934: C'était un musicien by Maurice Gleize and Friedrich Zelnik
 1936: La Mariée du régiment'' by Maurice Cammage

External links 
 René Mercier on data.bnf.fr
 
 Interprétation de Verdun ! On ne passe pas! by Jules Wolf (1878-1955)
 Adieu vieille Europe  by the Légion étrangère

French operetta composers
French film score composers
French conductors (music)
French male conductors (music)
Date of birth unknown
1973 deaths
French male film score composers